Kadamattathu Kathanar is an Indian Malayalam-language supernatural drama television series which was originally aired on Asianet from 2004 to 2005. Asianet retelecast the series on Asianet Plus channel from March 2016. Prakash Paul plays the title character.

Synopsis 
Kadamattathu Kathanar (an oriental Syriac priest of Kadamattom Church) also known as Kadamattathachan (Father Kadamattom) is a priest who is believed to have possessed supernatural powers and whose legends are closely related to the beginning of the Kadamattom Church, one of the oldest church buildings that still exists in Kerala the land of Saint Thomas Christians.

The story revolves around a traditional family in Kerala which is haunted by Yakshi, a vampire. The family seeks the help of Reverend Kadamattom, a Christian priest who was believed to have supernatural powers to gage them out of the problems happening around the family.

Cast 

 Prakash Paul as Reverend Kadamattom/ Kadamattathachan
 Sukanya as Kalliyankattu Neeli and Yakshiyamma
 Poornima Anand / Suvarna Mathew as Neeli's alternate appearance
 Geetha Nair as Therutha
 Anila Sreekumar as Madhavi
 Manu Varma as Ramu
 Narendra Prasad as Mepradan Thirumeni
 Jagannathan as Achuthan Nair
 Kumarakom Raghunath as Madhava Kurup
 Sangeetha Rajendran as Panchali
 Shanavas as Kannappan
 Bheeman Raghu as Ittan Pada Nair
 Biju Pappan as Odiyan
 Anand Kumar as Keshu
 Sukumari as Dhathri
 Prathapachandran as Bhaskaran
 Reena as Janaki
 Aranmula Ponnamma as Valyamma
 Harsha Nair as Devootty
 Rekha Ratheesh as Ittan Pada Nair's wife
 Kollam Thulasi as Neeli's father
 Maniyanpilla Raju as Neelaswaran
 Priyanga Anoop as Manga
 Sreekala as Thamburatti
 Machan Varghese as  Devassy
 M. S. Thripunithura as Poojari
 Anitha Nair as Seetha
 Anil Mohan as Seetha's husband
 Baby Prakashitha as Lekshmikutty, seetha's daughter
 Sidha Raj as Chadayan 
 Lalithasree as Durgamma
 Thara Kalyan as Ambika/Marthandan
 Ashokan as Udayan Thampuran
 Chembil Ashokan
 Kozhikode Narayanan Nair
 Kalasala Babu as Chanthukutty Melan
 Soniya Baiju Kottarakkara as Mandhana
 Yathikumar as Kulavana Potti
 Bhavani as Mariyamma
 Shalu Menon as Kochuthresia
 Manka Mahesh as Subhadramma
 Sreeja Chandran as Subhadra's daughter
 Anju as Ettukettu Veetil Bhanumathy
 Shammi Thilakan as Unnikuttan
 Meenakshi Sunil as Seetha
 Mahima
 Baby Sowbhagya Venkitesh as Kunjava
 Master Arun 
 Rajendran as Unnikuttan's brother
 Aishwariyaa Bhaskaran as Thirumala / Yakshi
 Bharat Gopy as Killimangalam Thirumeni
 Mala Aravindan 
 Ramya Salim as Katrina
 Renjini Krishna
 Lakshmi Sanal
 Baby Alis Christy
 P. I. Ibrahimkutty as Achankunju
 Gayathri Varsha as Devaki
 M. G. Sreekumar as Singer in Church 
 Venu Nagavally as Ettichettan
 Krishna Kumar as Nicholas
 Reshmi Soman as Emily Nicholas
 Master Venkatesh as Allen Nicholas
 Fathima Babu as Nicholas's mother
 Kunchan as Ammachan
 Karthika Kannan as Clara
 Kochu Preman as Traveller
 Jija Surendran as Umma
 G. K. Pillai as Mahapandithan
 Dinesh Panicker as Maharajan
 Gopalan
 Rajasaheb as Kochouseph
 Roopa Sree as Saramma
 Zeenath as Kalyani Amma
 Keerikkadan Jose as Jathavedan
 Baburaj as Atmavedan
 Rudhra as Mythili
 Sreelatha Namboothiri as Kumki
 Rani Larius
 Rukmini as Ammaluvamma
 Ninu Thomas as Janaki
 Shaju as Neelakandan
 Raghavan as Fr. Emmanuel
 Urmila Unni as Thampuratti
 Harishanth as Ayilyam Thirunal Udaya Varma (Thripangottu Thampuran)
 Rajan P. Dev as Kalidasan
 Poojappura Radhakrishnan
 Mayoori as Kalyani / Yakshi
 Sreenath as Jagadhan
 Suma Jayaram as Sathyabhama
 Subbalakshmi as Bhageerathi 
Abitha as Unnimaya
 Kalady Omana as Kuttiyamma 
 Sajitha Betti as Gouri / Yakshi
 Ramesh Valiyasala  as Kammaran
 T. P. Madhavan as Nambiar
 Kuttyedathi Vilasini as Nambiar's grandmother
 V. K. Sreeraman as Raugandharayanan
 Anil Murali as Vairajatha
 Kanakalatha as Devammaji
 Chandra Lakshman as Kadambari
 Remyasree as Devasena
 Baiju as Shravanan 
 Madhu as Vasudevan's father
 Anju Aravind as Bhanumathi 
 Raji Nair
 Suma Jayaram as Rani
 Chali Pala as Agnisarman
 Koottickal Jayachandran as Vasudevan
 P. Sreekumar as Fr. Abel
 Kailasnath
 Kollam Shah 
 Spadikam George as Lucifer
 Poojappura Ravi as Bhattathiri
 Aneesh Ravi as Thomakutty
 Jagannatha Varma as Thampuran
 Saju Kodiyan as Chacko Chettan
 Kottayam Nazeer as Kuttappan
 Lissy Jose as Chacko Chettan's wife
 Sindhu Jacob
 Chaya Govind
 Sreekutty

References

External links 
 Official Website

2016 Indian television series debuts
Malayalam-language television shows
Asianet (TV channel) original programming